Agonopterix acuta is a moth in the family Depressariidae. It was described by Stringer in 1930. It is found in Japan.

References

Moths described in 1930
Agonopterix
Moths of Japan